Ariagne Cuesta Zulueta (born 1987) is a Cuban team handball player. She has played on the Cuban national team, and participated at the 2011 World Women's Handball Championship in Brazil.

References

1987 births
Living people
Cuban female handball players
Handball players at the 2007 Pan American Games
Pan American Games medalists in handball
Pan American Games silver medalists for Cuba
Medalists at the 2007 Pan American Games
21st-century Cuban women